Thomas James Pham (born March 8, 1988) is an American professional baseball outfielder for the New York Mets of Major League Baseball (MLB). He has previously played in MLB for the St. Louis Cardinals, Tampa Bay Rays, San Diego Padres, Cincinnati Reds, and Boston Red Sox.

Pham was selected by the Cardinals in the 16th round of the 2006 MLB draft. He overcame a number of injuries and a vision impairment in 2008 related to keratoconus (which he overcame the following year with contact lenses that give him 20/15 vision in both eyes) to make his major league debut nine seasons after being drafted. In 2017, Pham became the first Cardinals batter since 1900 to record at least a .300 batting average, 20 home runs, 20 doubles, and 20 stolen bases in the same season.

Early life and amateur career
Pham was born in Las Vegas, Nevada, to Tawana (age 17) and Anhtuan (age 19). His twin sister Brittany was born two minutes later. At the time, his father was incarcerated, as he would be for most of their lives. His father was born in Vietnam to a Vietnamese mother and an African American father, and moved to the United States with his mother, brother, and sister. Pham's father was gifted in American football, but became entangled in drugs and street crime for decades.

Pham’s mother’s parents helped her raise her twins on the condition that she work. She had not finished high school, and took on jobs as a busser, a casino waitress, and at a bakery, and raised the twins in Spring Valley, Nevada. Between the ages of two years and  years, Pham wore leg braces; his pediatrician feared that he had contracted rickets.  Because his mother worked so much, Pham said he "can count on one hand" the number of his games that she attended throughout his life. When he was five years old, his mother married an electrician named Fred Polk, and they had a daughter named Mercedes. Pham "has had issues" with his stepfather, and says that once when Pham was 25 years old and in a fight with him, his stepfather stabbed him.

Pham attended Gorman High School, Centennial High School, and then Durango High School in Spring Valley, where he played baseball as a pitcher and infielder. As a senior, Pham was named the Class 4A All-State Player of the Year by the Reno Gazette-Journal and a second team All-American, after batting .581.  With a fastball in the  range, he drew some interest as a pitching prospect, but did not like to pitch and rarely pitched his senior year.  He originally committed to play college baseball at Arizona, and then switched his commitment to Cal State Fullerton, though he did not attend Cal State either.  Ultimately, after the St. Louis Cardinals selected him in the 16th round of the 2006 amateur draft, Pham opted for professional baseball over college.  He received a $325,000 signing bonus, higher than most players drafted as late as the 16th round.

Professional career

Minor leagues

Pham began his minor league career in 2006 batting .231/.340/.324 with one home run in 216 plate appearances, with the Rookie League Johnson City Cardinals. He played shortstop, and made 22 errors in 37 games, for an .849 fielding percentage. In 2007 he was then shifted to the outfield, and batted .188/.272/.277 with two home runs in 303 plate appearances for the Class A- Batavia Muckdogs and Class A Swing of the Quad Cities.

In 2008 he hit .203/.272/.396 with a career-high 156 strikeouts in 438 plate appearances for Class A Quad Cities and the Class A+ Palm Beach Cardinals.  In 2009 he batted .232/.313/.378 in 380 plate appearances in Class A+.  In 2010 he suffered a small fracture in his wrist.  In a June 2011 game, he tore a wrist ligament. He played 40 games and batted .294.

In early 2012, he suffered a torn left shoulder labrum, costing him most of the season. For the 2012 season, he batted .154 in 43 plate appearances for the AA Springfield Cardinals.  After promotion to AAA Memphis Redbirds of the Pacific Coast League (PCL) in 2013, he tore his other labrum.  He returned to Springfield after rehabilitation. He batted .264 for Memphis in 30 games, and .301 for Springfield in 45 games.  Pham played most of the 2014 season for Memphis, appearing in 104 games, and batted .324/.395/.491, with 63 runs scored, 16 doubles, six triples, 10 home runs and 44 runs batted in (RBI). In 2014-15 he played for Leones del Caracas in the Venezuelan Winter League, batting .143 in 63 plate appearances.

St. Louis Cardinals
Pham was called up to the major leagues with the Cardinals for the first time on September 7, 2014. In 2014, he struck out in both of his only two plate appearances.

2015
Pham opened the next season with Memphis, but missed the first two months with a strained left quadriceps.  On June 9, Pham hit two home runs and a career-high five RBI against the Iowa Cubs.  In his first 24 games after returning from the disabled list, he batted .338. Pham later was named the best defensive outfielder of the PCL for 2015 by Baseball America.

The Cardinals recalled Pham to the major league club on July 3, 2015, and in a 2–1 victory over the San Diego Padres the next day, he doubled for his first major league hit, then later in the game pilfered his first stolen base and scored the winning run, his first major league run.  On July 5, Pham hit his first major league home run, hit another double, and drove in all three of the Cardinals' runs – his first three major league RBI – as the Cardinals again defeated the Padres, 3–1.

On September 16, Pham tripled and had his first multi-home run game, against the Milwaukee Brewers in a 5–4 victory.  He had homered in three consecutive plate appearances spanning his last at bat previous to the game, September 13 against the Cincinnati Reds.  In the next game against the Brewers, Pham doubled and tripled, giving him six hits and eight RBI in consecutive games against Milwaukee. The Cardinals won the National League Central division.  Pham made his major league postseason debut as a pinch hitter during the bottom of the eighth inning of Game 1 of the 2015 National League Division Series (NLDS) against the Cubs, and hit his first career home run against Jon Lester.

2016
The Cardinals selected Pham for the Opening Day roster in 2016.  He injured his left oblique during batting practice on Opening Day.  He was the first player following the start of the regular season to be placed on the DL.  The club reactivated him from the DL on May 17, and optioned him back to Memphis.

In 2016, he batted .226/.324/.440 in 183 plate appearances over 78 games. For the season, he had the highest strikeout percentage against left-handed pitchers (41.7%).

2017
Pham did not make the 2017 Opening Day roster out of spring training, and began the season at Memphis. After batting .283/.371/.500 at Memphis with four home runs and 19 RBIs in 25 games, he was recalled to the Cardinals on May 5.

On May 7, 2017, Pham homered twice versus the Atlanta Braves at SunTrust Park among a season-high four hits.  His second home run provided the deciding runs in a 6−4, 14-inning victory. Pham eventually became the starting right fielder.  He finished the season batting .306/.411/.520 with 23 home runs, 73 RBIs, 22 doubles, and 25 stolen bases in 128 games. He became the first Cardinals batter since 1900 to record at least a .300 average, 20 home runs, 20 doubles, and 20 stolen bases in the same season. He also was 3rd in the league in power-speed number (24.0). On the bases, he led the major leagues by being picked off six times, the most by a Cardinal in 29 years. Pham placed tenth in the majors in Fangraphs' Wins Above Replacement (WAR).  He ranked 11th in the National League Most Valuable Player Award (NL MVP) voting, the only Cardinals player to receive votes.

Pham's at-times dominant performance led to the portmanteau "Pham-tastic," from others as well as himself.  Pham said that he kept himself disciplined with intense workout regimens and used technology such as Statcast data to sharpen and increase his playing skills.

2018
The Cardinals named Pham their starting center fielder prior to the 2018 season.

On April 25, while Pham practiced between his at bats in a batting cage, a resistance band contraption that Pham had designed himself failed, and his bat snapped off the band and cracked Pham in his forehead. It resulted in blunt trauma to Pham's head, and a significant contusion.  Manager Mike Matheny removed him from the game. He was not placed on the disabled list, and returned to action a few games later. In 2018, he batted .248/.331/.399 for the Cardinals, in 396 plate appearances over 98 games.

Tampa Bay Rays

On July 31, 2018, the Cardinals traded Pham to the Tampa Bay Rays along with $500,000 of international bonus pool money for minor leaguers Justin Williams, Génesis Cabrera, and Roel Ramírez. At the time of the trade, Pham was batting .248 with 14 home runs and 41 RBIs. Following the trade, he said, "I'm just disappointed… I wanted to give more, from a playing perspective. I got involved in the community. I really enjoyed being able to do that… I had an opportunity here. They gave me a chance."

In his second game as a Ray, Pham fractured his foot while being hit by a pitch, and went on the 10-day disabled list. The Rays activated Pham on August 16, and he recorded his first two hits as a Ray that night in a game against the New York Yankees. On August 25, Pham hit his first home run in a Rays uniform, a solo shot off Brandon Workman of the Boston Red Sox. Pham was named to the MLB team of the month for September after he hit .368/.407/.705 with five home runs and 17 runs batted in. In 39 games for the Rays, he hit .343/.448/.622 with seven home runs and 22 RBIs, while primarily playing left field.

On April 5, 2019, Pham reached base for the 40th straight game, the longest in Rays history. On April 6, Pham hit his first ever grand slam. In 2019 he batted .273/.369/.450, and led the major leagues in infield hits (25). On defense, he had the best fielding percentage of all major left fielders (1.000). A self-described student of the game, he said "I’m probably one of the one percent of the game that understands the sabermetrics."

San Diego Padres

On December 6, 2019, Pham and Jake Cronenworth were traded to the San Diego Padres in exchange for Hunter Renfroe, Xavier Edwards, and a player to be named later (PTBNL). The PTBNL, Esteban Quiroz, was named in March 2020.

In the pandemic-shortened 2020 season, Pham slashed .211/.312/.312 with 3 home runs and 12 RBIs in 125 plate appearances over 31 games. He hit ground balls 63.2% of the time, the third-highest percentage in the NL. On August 16, 2020, he suffered a fractured hamate bone in his left hand and underwent surgery, missing a month of action.

In October 2020, Pham was in an altercation outside a strip club in San Diego, and was stabbed in his lower back. He underwent surgery, in which he received 200 stitches. When fans later heckled him with profanity with regard to the incident, Pham said: "When someone comes up to me cursing at me like that, I could defend myself and, you know, I'm a very good fighter. I don't do Muay Thai, kung fu and box for no reason.”

Later in the 2020 offseason, he underwent his third surgery since August. The surgery was to address a tear in the cartilage on the small finger side of his left wrist.

In 2021, Pham batted .229 (the 7th-lowest batting average in the NL)/.340/.383(3rd-lowest) with 15 home runs, 49 RBIs, and 14 stolen bases in 561 plate appearances over 155 games. He led the major leagues with 30 pinch hitting appearances. On November 3, the Padres granted him free agency.

Cincinnati Reds
On March 26, 2022, Pham signed a one-year contract, with a mutual option for 2023, with the Cincinnati Reds. Speaking about  his goals, he said: “I’m playing to get my numbers. There's nothing selfish about that... I don’t care about anything else. I got to look out for me.”

On April 19, after his former teammate Luke Voit collided with Pham's teammate Tyler Stephenson at home plate while unsuccessfully trying to score, Pham criticized Voit’s slide. He offered to fight Voit, and said: "If Luke wants to settle it, I get down really well. Anything, Muay Thai, whatever. I've got a (gym) owner here who will let me use his facility. So, fuck 'em."

On May 28, Pham was suspended three games and fined $5,000 for slapping Joc Pederson of the San Francisco Giants in the face prior to a game. Pham said his slap was prompted by a Pederson group text of a meme seven months prior, in a fantasy football league in which they both participated, and Pederson's interpretation of the fantasy league rules.  Pham said he had no regrets about his slap. Pham explained: "It’s a matter of principle, man."

In 91 games with Cincinnati, Pham batted .238 with 11 home runs and 39 RBIs.

Boston Red Sox
On August 1, 2022, Pham was traded to the Boston Red Sox for a player to be named later or cash considerations. In 53 games with Boston, Pham batted .234/.298/.374 with 6 home runs and 24 RBIs, completing the season batting .236 with a .312 on base percentage and .374 slugging percentage, with 17 home runs and 63 RBIs in 144 games. On November 10, 2022, the Red Sox announced that both the team and Pham declined a mutual option, making him a free agent.

New York Mets
On January 24, 2023, Pham signed a one-year. $6 million contract with the New York Mets.

Personal life
Pham is of both African American and Vietnamese (25%) heritage. He is the first person of Vietnamese descent to play in MLB since pitcher Danny Graves in 2006.

Pham suffers from keratoconus, a rare eye disorder which causes degenerative vision. After Pham started experiencing vision issues in 2008, it was not until the next year when Pham began wearing contact lenses in 2009, that gave him 20/15 vision in both eyes, that he was able to track pitches to the best of his ability.

Pham had surgery at UC San Diego Health following a stabbing, which took place on October 11, 2020, during a fight in San Diego outside a local strip club.

Pham shared in 2022 that he is a gambler, saying: "I'm a big dog in Vegas. I'm a high roller at many casinos. You can look at my credit line."

References

External links

1988 births
Living people
African-American baseball players
American sportspeople of Vietnamese descent
Baseball players from Nevada
Batavia Muckdogs players
Boston Red Sox players
Cincinnati Reds players
Fraternal twins
Johnson City Cardinals players
Leones del Caracas players
Major League Baseball outfielders
Memphis Redbirds players
Navegantes del Magallanes players
American expatriate baseball players in Venezuela
Palm Beach Cardinals players
Quad Cities River Bandits players
San Diego Padres players
Sportspeople from the Las Vegas Valley
Sportspeople with a vision impairment
Springfield Cardinals players
St. Louis Cardinals players
Stabbing survivors
Swing of the Quad Cities players
Tampa Bay Rays players
Twin sportspeople
20th-century African-American people
21st-century African-American sportspeople